The list shows coat of arms for the forty-seven counties of Kenya. Some counties adopted the coat of arms of the defunct district governments. Other coat of arms adopted in the year after the first county governments came into power which was between March 4, 2013 to the same date on 2014. As of Dec 17th 2014 not all county assemblies have passed the design of the county coat of arms. It is expected that all counties will adopt their own flags soon.

Some counties have both a coat of arms and a seal, because of history even though the coat of arms of some counties look like a seal, they aren't seals unless specified by the respective county governments. There are also counties that use their logos as coat of arms.

Coat of arms

Seals

Logos

See also 
Flags of the Counties of Kenya

References

Counties of Kenya
Kenyan symbols by county